is a Japanese professional basketball player who plays for the Kumamoto Volters of the B.League in Japan.

Career statistics 

|-
| align="left" |  2013-14
| align="left" | Hitachi
| 3 ||  ||10.0  || .182 ||.125  ||.000  ||0.0  || 2.0 || 0.3 || 0.0 ||  1.7
|-
| align="left" | 2014-15
| align="left" | Hitachi
| 27 ||  || 8.0 ||.273  ||.188  || .733 || 0.6 ||1.0  ||0.3  ||0.0  ||1.7
|-
| align="left" |  2015-16
| align="left" | Iwate
| 52 || 38 || 25.9 || .340 || .276 || .655 || 2.6 || 3.1 || 1.5 || 0.1 || 5.7
|-
|style="background-color:#FFCCCC"  align="left" |  2016-17
| align="left" | Sendai
| 48 || 35 ||23.3  ||.395  ||.262  || .734 || 2.1 || 2.4 || 0.7 || 0.2 ||  7.0
|-
| align="left" |  2017-18
| align="left" | Sendai
| 60 || 59 ||28.6  ||.370  ||.322  || .775 || 2.4 || 5.4 || 1.2 || 0.1 ||  11.0
|-
| align="left" |  2018-19
| align="left" | Shinshu
| 59 || 59 ||30.4  ||.399  ||.305  || .789 || 2.2 || 6.6 || 1.0 || 0.0 ||  12.1
|-

References

1990 births
Living people
Iwate Big Bulls players
Japanese men's basketball players
Kumamoto Volters players
Sendai 89ers players
Sendai University Meisei High School alumni
Shinshu Brave Warriors players
Basketball players from Tokyo
Sun Rockers Shibuya players
Guards (basketball)